The women's team competition of the artistic swimming events at the 2019 Pan American Games in Lima were held on 29−31 July at the Aquatics Centre. The Canadian team repeated as Pan American Champions.

All eight teams competed in both rounds of the competition. The first round consisted of a technical, while the second round was a free routine.  The winner was the team with the highest combined score.

Schedule
All times are local (UTC−5)

Results

References

Artistic swimming at the 2019 Pan American Games